This is a list of bluegrass music festivals that have Wikipedia articles or are otherwise verified by an independent, reliable, published source. This list may have some overlap with the umbrella topic list of folk festivals, and more complete overlap with list of country music festivals.

Bluegrass music is a form of American roots music, and a subgenre of country music. Bluegrass was inspired by the music of Appalachia. It has mixed roots in Irish, Scottish, Welsh, and English traditional music, and also later influenced by the music of African-Americans through incorporation of jazz elements.

Festivals

North America

Oceania

Europe

Gallery

See also
List of music festivals

References

External links

Bluegrass